Raheem Fukwan Brock (born June 10, 1978) is a former American football defensive end who played in the National Football League.

He played college football at Temple.  He was drafted by the Philadelphia Eagles in the seventh round of the 2002 NFL Draft, but was never signed by them. Brock subsequently played for the Indianapolis Colts for eight years, winning Super Bowl XLI with them over the Chicago Bears, and he also played with the Seattle Seahawks.

Early years
Brock grew up in the Germantown area of Philadelphia.  He is the son of Zachary Dixon, a former NFL running back and return man from 1979 to 1985.  He spent most of his childhood with his mother, Patricia, but lived with his father in Maryland in fifth grade and spent much of his summers with him.

He attended Murrell Dobbins Tech in Philadelphia, Pennsylvania and was a letterman in football until his graduation in 1996. He played tight end, linebacker, and punter. As a freshman, he helped the team win the Philadelphia Public League championship.  As a 6-foot-3, 240-pound senior, he was all-Philadelphia first-team selection by The Philadelphia Inquirer after racking up 88 tackles, five sacks and six interceptions as a linebacker.

College career
Brock was a four-year letterman at defensive end for Temple University and started 39 career games.  He finished his career with 184 tackles, 20 sacks, and 38 stops for losses.  He graduated in May 2001 with an undergraduate's degree in marketing.

Professional career

NFL draft
Despite his impressive pedigree and stats, Brock was downgraded by draft experts due to his less-than-desired height for a defensive end and lack of quickness and jumping ability to make up for it.

Brock was drafted in the seventh round of the 2002 NFL Draft by the Philadelphia Eagles, but his draft rights were renounced by the team on July 25, 2002, before the 2002 season began, due to an inability to fit him into their rookie salary cap.  Brock's agent commented that there was significant interest from other teams about signing him and that "The Eagles will look bad if one of two things happen: if Raheem turns out to be a player at a position that's hard to find good players, or if one of the Eagles' defensive linemen gets injured."

Indianapolis Colts
Brock was claimed off waivers by the Indianapolis Colts on July 28, 2002. During his 8 seasons with the Colts, he started 104 regular-season games (76 at defensive end and 28 at tackle), frequently alternating with Dwight Freeney and Robert Mathis.  He had 28.5 sacks and 408 tackles, while forcing 12 fumbles and recovering 15 fumbles. He helped the Colts win Super Bowl XLI and played his last game for them in Super Bowl XLIV.  He was released on March 7, 2010.  In 2013, he was named to The Indianapolis Star's "All-time Indianapolis Colts team."

Tennessee Titans
Brock signed with the Tennessee Titans on August 12, 2010. He was released on September 5.

Seattle Seahawks
Brock signed with the Seattle Seahawks on September 8, 2010.

During Brock's 2010 season with the Seahawks, he posted 9.0 regular season sacks, a career high, and recorded 2.5 sacks during the post season.  His 11.5 sacks during 2010 are both career Highs and season highs for Brock.

He returned for one season in Seattle after failing to get a longer contract anywhere else.  Seattle then drafted Bruce Irvin in the 1st round of the 2012 draft to replace Brock, leaving him as an unsigned free agent.

Personal life
Brock married Deziree Williams, whom he had met at Temple and dated throughout college, in June 2002.  They had one daughter together, born in July 2003, before they divorced in October 2005.

On the morning of November 13, 2010, Brock was pulled over after being observed driving 85-90 mph in a 60 mph zone. A preliminary breath test indicated a blood alcohol concentration of .133; the legal limit in Washington is .08. Later breath tests at the University of Washington Police Department measured Brock's BAC at .115 and .111.  On December 6, 2011, more than a year after his DUI arrest, Brock was charged with driving under the influence. The King County prosecutor's office reportedly lost the file and only found it after a journalist from Philadelphia inquired about the status of the case.
	
On June 16, 2011, Brock was arrested for walking out on a $27 bar tab. On November 23, 2011, Brock was convicted of theft in the incident, but the conviction was overturned upon appeal on April 27, 2012.

Brock founded The Raheem Brock Student-Athlete Scholarship in 2007, which was created with the intent of providing financial assistance to male and female students attending Dobbins C.T.E. High School pursuing a post-secondary education.

References

External links

 Seattle Seahawks bio
 Danny O'Neill, "Details of Raheem Brock's DUI arrest" from the Seattle Times' Seahawks Blog, November 18, 2010.

1978 births
Living people
Players of American football from Newark, New Jersey
Players of American football from Philadelphia
African-American players of American football
American football defensive ends
American football defensive tackles
Temple Owls football players
Philadelphia Eagles players
Indianapolis Colts players
Tennessee Titans players
Seattle Seahawks players
21st-century African-American sportspeople
20th-century African-American sportspeople